Once Upon a Mind is the sixth studio album by the English singer James Blunt, released on 25 October 2019 through Atlantic Records. Blunt was due to embark on the Once Upon a Mind Tour in 2021. A deluxe version of the album – the Time Suspended Edition – was released on 26 June 2020 featuring two new demo songs and six acoustic tracks.

Singles
The first single from the album, "Cold", was released on 29 August 2019. The video was then released on 9 September 2019.

Track listing
Credits partially adapted from ASCAP.

Personnel
James Blunt        –  vocals, composer
Steve Robson       –  guitar, organ, piano, programming, producer
Matt Zara          –  guitar, programming
John Garrison      –  bass
Karl Brazil        –  drums
Nate Cyphert       –  background vocals, composer
Sam Miller         –  engineer
Jorge Arango Kure  –  engineer
Mike Tarantino     –  editing
Brian D. Willis    –  editing
Tom Rothrock       –  mixing
Chris Cehringer    –  mastering
Paul Samuels       –  A&R
Gavin Bond         –  photography

Charts

Weekly charts

Year-end charts

References

2019 albums
James Blunt albums
Albums produced by TMS (production team)